Oktyabrsky City District is an administrative district (raion), one of the 10 raions of Novosibirsk, Russia. Population: 225,879 (2017).

History
 1929 – Zakamensky District was renamed the Oktyabrsky District.

Streets

Architecture

Tsarist architecture

Soviet architecture

Post-soviet architecture

Tourist attractions

Mikhailovskaya Embankment
The Mikhailovskaya Embankment is located between Bolshevistskaya Street and Ob River.

Large Novosibirsk Planetarium
Large Novosibirsk Planetarium is located in the Klyuch-Kamyshenskoye Plateau Micridistrict. It was opened in 2012. One of the two planetariums of Novosibirsk.

Education

Universities
 Novosibirsk State Agricultural University
 Novosibirsk State Pedagogical University
 Novosibirsk State University of Architecture and Civil Engineering
 Siberian State University of Telecommunications and Informatics

Educational institutes
 Siberian Institute of Management, branch of the RANEPA
 Novosibirsk Military Institute

Libraries
 State Public Scientific & Technological Library
 Tolstoy Library is one of the oldest libraries in Novosibirsk.

Economy

Industry
 Elektrosignal Plant
 Novosibirsk Chocolate Factory
 Novosibirsk Tool Plant
 OJSC Novosibirsk Refinery is a plant that produces products of gold, silver, platinum and other precious metals.
 Novosibirsk Thermal Power Plant 5
 Oksid Plant
 Stankosib
 Trud Plant

Transportation

River
Oktyabrsky City District has one passenger river terminal (Rechnoy Vokzal).

Bus and trolleybus

Tram
12 tram stops are located in the district.

Railway
Four railway stations are located in the district: Rechnoy Vokzal, Novosibirsk-Yuzhny, Instrumentalny, Kamyshenskaya.

Metro
Three Novosibirsk Metro stations are located in the district: Rechnoy Vokzal, Oktyabrskaya, Zolotaya Niva.

References